USS LST-884 was an LST-542-class tank landing ship in the United States Navy. Like many of her class, she was not named and is properly referred to by her hull designation.

LST-884 was laid down on 23 July 1944 at Pittsburgh, Pennsylvania, by the Dravo Corporation; launched on 30 September 1944; sponsored by Mrs. Michael Durkin; and commissioned on 10 October 1944.

Service history
During World War II, LST-884 was assigned to the Asiatic-Pacific theater and participated in the assault and occupation of Iwo Jima in February 1945 and the assault and occupation of Okinawa Gunto in April 1945. Due to extensive damage resulting from a kamikaze attack on 1 April 1945, LST-884 was decommissioned on 16 February 1946, and her hulk was sunk on 6 May 1946. The ship was struck from the Navy list on 21 May 1946.

LST-884 earned two battle stars for World War II service.

References

External links
 LST-884 Okinawa after action report, January-February 1945

 

LST-542-class tank landing ships
World War II amphibious warfare vessels of the United States
Ships built in Pittsburgh
1944 ships
Ships built by Dravo Corporation